Françoise Férat (born 5 March 1949) is a French politician and a member of the Senate of France. She represents the Marne department and is a member of the Centrist Alliance.

References

1949 births
Living people
Union for French Democracy politicians
Democratic Movement (France) politicians
Centrist Alliance politicians
French Senators of the Fifth Republic
Women members of the Senate (France)
21st-century French women politicians
Union of Democrats and Independents politicians
Senators of Marne (department)
People from Épernay
Politicians from Grand Est